Karlo Primorac (born 1 June 1984 in Osijek) is a Croatian footballer who plays as a forward.

Club career
A product of Osijek academy, Primorac joined their first team squad in the 2003–04 season and appeared in 17 matches for the club in his first top-flight season. He went on to establish himself as a regular member of Osijek's starting eleven and he appeared in a total of 136 Prva HNL matches and scored 25 goals before being released from the club in January 2010. He was then picked up by Dinamo Zagreb almost immediately, and he signed for the Blues on a free transfer in February 2010. Primorac also played with NK Karlovac and NK Istra 1961.

In 2013, Primorac signed a contract with Sime Darby F.C., then a Malaysia Premier League club. He finished the 2013 season as top scorer in the league, as Sime Darby gained promotion to 2014 Malaysia Super League as runners-up behind Sarawak FA. At the end of the season, he changed club to play with Malaysia Super League club PKNS F.C.

International career
Primorac was also capped for the Croatia U21 national team, appearing in 9 matches and scoring one goal.

References

External links

1984 births
Living people
Sportspeople from Osijek
Association football forwards
Croatian footballers
Croatia youth international footballers
Croatia under-21 international footballers
NK Osijek players
GNK Dinamo Zagreb players
NK Karlovac players
NK Istra 1961 players
Sime Darby F.C. players
PKNS F.C. players
Croatian Football League players
Malaysia Premier League players
Malaysia Super League players
Croatian expatriate footballers
Expatriate footballers in Malaysia
Croatian expatriate sportspeople in Malaysia